The Ethal House is a historic home at Poughkeepsie, Dutchess County, New York.  It was built about 1910 and is a -story, three-bay-wide frame Bungalow–style dwelling on a raised cobblestone foundation.  It has a gable roof with wide dormer and a large stone chimney.

It was added to the National Register of Historic Places in 1982.

Notes

References

Houses on the National Register of Historic Places in New York (state)
American Craftsman architecture in New York (state)
Houses completed in 1910
Houses in Poughkeepsie, New York
National Register of Historic Places in Poughkeepsie, New York